North Africa American Cemetery and Memorial is a Second World War military war grave cemetery, located in the town of Carthage in Tunisia. It is administered by the American Battle Monuments Commission.

Description

Headstones are set in straight lines subdivided into nine rectangular plots by wide paths, with decorative pools at their intersections. Along the southeast edge of the burial area, bordering the tree-lined terrace leading to the memorial is the Wall of the Missing. On this wall 3,724 names are engraved. Rosettes mark the names of those since recovered and identified.

The chapel and the memorial court, which contains large maps in mosaic and ceramic depicting the operations and supply activities of American forces across Africa to the Persian Gulf, were designed to harmonize with local architecture. The chapel interior is decorated with polished marble, flags and sculpture.

Location

It is near the present town of the same name,  from the city of Tunis.

Notable interments

 Captain Foy Draper (1911–1943), Gold Medal Olympic sprinter (1936 Olympics) and USAAF pilot
 Private Nicholas Minue (1905–1943), Medal of Honor recipient for his bravery near Majaz al Bab, Tunisia
 First Lieutenant Robert M. Emery (1911–1942), Distinguished Service Cross (posthumous) for his actions near Djebel Mrdajajdo in Algeria

References

External links

 American Battle Monuments Commission – North Africa American Cemetery and Memorial
 

Cemeteries in Tunisia
World War II cemeteries
World War II memorials
World War II sites in Tunisia
American Battle Monuments Commission
Tunisia–United States relations